The royal mantle of the Netherlands is worn only by the Dutch monarch at their inauguration. As the Dutch monarch is never crowned but inaugurated, its more appropriate to speak of a royal mantle than a coronation mantle.

The royal mantle of Netherlands is a red velvet trimmed coat lined with white ermine and 83 Dutch lions embroidered with gold threads.

It was last worn at the inauguration of King Willem-Alexander.

Bibliography 
 Elzinga, E. (1990): Theater van staat: oude tradities rond een jong koningschap, Rijksmuseum Paleis Het Loo, Apeldoorn
 Fasseur, C. (1998): Wilhelmina, de jonge koningin, Balans, Amsterdam
 Grijpma, Dieuwke (1999): Kleren voor de elite. Nederlandse couturiers en hun klanten 1882-2000, Balans, Amsterdam,

External links 
 www.volkskrant.nl: De koningsmantel van Willem-Alexander: een slechte kopie met 'C&A-bont

Dutch clothing
Royal attire